Ottarathiri Township is one of Naypyidaw Union Territory's eight townships, located south of Mandalay Region in Burma.

History
Ottarathiri Township formerly part of Mandalay Division. The township was designated as one of the original townships constituting the new capital region of Naypyidaw on 26 March 2006 by the Ministry of Home Affairs (MOHA). 7 village tracts, consisting of 39 villages from Pyinmana Township, and 3 village tracts, consisting of 9 villages from Tatkon Township were separated to form Ottarathiri Township.

Ottarathiri is derived from Pali , and literally means "splendor of the north."

Demographics

2014

The 2014 Myanmar Census reported that Ottarathiri Township had a population of 81,620. The population density was 98.2 people per km2. The census reported that the median age was 25.6 years, and 103 males per 100 females. There were 18,661 households; the mean household size was 4.1.

References

Naypyidaw